Hazuri Bagh is a garden in Lahore, Punjab, Pakistan, bounded by the Lahore Fort to the east, Badshahi Mosque to the west, the Samadhi of Ranjit Singh to the north, and the Roshnai Gate to the south. The garden was built during the reign of Maharaja Ranjit Singh, in the style of Mughal gardens. In the centre of the garden stands the Hazuri Bagh Baradari, built by the Maharaja in 1818 to celebrate his capture of the Koh-i-Noor diamond from Shuja Shah Durrani in 1813. The Serai Alamgiri caravanserai formerly stood where Hazuri Bagh is now located.

History

The Hazuri Bagh garden was planned and built under the supervision of Faqir Azizuddin in the traditional Mughal style layout. After its completion, it is said, Ranjit Singh, at the suggestion of Jamadar Khushhal Singh, ordered that marble vandalized from various mausoleums of Lahore to construct a baradari (pavilion) here. This task was given to Khalifa Nooruddin. Elegant carved marble pillars support the baradari's delicate cusped arches. The central area, where Ranjit Singh held court, has a mirrored ceiling. Both the garden and the baradari, originally a 45-foot, three-storey square with a basement approached by fifteen steps, suffered extensive damage during the  Sikh wars and was only reclaimed and laid out according to the original plan during the British period. On 19 July 1932, the top story collapsed and was never rebuilt or restored. The tomb of Muhammad Iqbal, completed in 1951, as well as of Sikandar Hayat Khan, the last Premier of the Punjab, lies across from the garden outside of the Badshahi Mosque.

Every Sunday afternoon, people gather in the garden to hear story tellers recite traditional Punjabi Qisse, such as Heer Ranjha and Sassi Punnun, and other Punjabi Sufi poetry.

Gallery

See also 
List of parks and gardens in Lahore
List of parks and gardens in Pakistan
List of gardens
Naulakha pavilion
Sheesh Mahal
 List of parks and gardens in Karachi

References

External links 

 A photo of Hazuri Bagh
 An older photo of Hazuri Bagh
The Herbert Offen Research Collection of the Phillips Library at the Peabody Essex Museum

Architecture of Lahore
Gardens in Lahore
Mughal gardens in Pakistan
Tourist attractions in Lahore
Walled City of Lahore
Landscape design history